The Executive Order on Combating Anti-Semitism is an executive order which was announced on December 10, 2019 and signed the next day by U.S. President Donald Trump. The said purpose of the order was to prevent antisemitism by making it easier to use laws which prohibit institutional discrimination against people based on race, color or national origin to punish discrimination against Jewish people, including opposition to Israel uniquely as a Jewish nationstate (the right of a Jewish country to exist) without opposition to other nation-states. The definition of anti-Semitism which is used in the executive order was written by the Holocaust Remembrance Alliance, which defines anti-Semitism as, “...a certain perception of Jews, which may be expressed as hatred toward Jews. Rhetorical and physical manifestations of anti-Semitism are directed toward Jewish or non-Jewish individuals and/or their property, toward Jewish community institutions and religious facilities.”

CNN claimed that a White House official had indicated that the order would define Judaism as a nationality rather than a religion in the United States, but the order which was ultimately released did not contain this definition of Judaism. The new order did not define Judaism as a nationality nor did it define Judaism as an ethnicity, nor did it change the way in which complaints of Title XI violations are handled. The act does not mean that all anti-Semitic incidents can be classified as a Title XI violation, it only specifies that the Office of Civil Rights must review incidents to determine if they should be enforced under Title XI.

Background 
Cases of anti-Semitism, particularly on college campuses, have increased since 2013 according to the executive order. A 2006 report by the United States Commission on Civil Rights found that anti-Semitism remained prevalent on college campuses and was often found in the context of anti-Israel and anti-Zionism protests. In the recommendations of the report, the USCCR called for the Office of Civil Rights to fully enforce any discriminatory actions against students of any religion, race, or national origin.

Anti-Semitism Acts of 2018 and 2019 
The introduction of the executive order followed the introduction of two acts in Congress – the Anti-Semitism Awareness Act of 2018 and the Anti-Semitism Awareness Act of 2019. The aim of these bills was to broaden the definition of anti-Semitism in attempts to enable its enforcement as a Title XI violation. These acts were controversial at their times of introduction in congress, prompting the ACLU to write a letter opposing the initial bill from 2018. In the letter the ACLU argued that the definition of anti-Semitism used in the bill extended to criticism of Israel and Zionism, thus limiting free speech.

Reception 
The order set off a firestorm of criticism among many Jewish and Palestinian leaders. Some American Jews praised the order, while others objected to defining Judaism as a nationality (as the order was initially indicated to do, though it ultimately did not), claiming that "Trump's reclassification of Judaism mirrored sentiments used by white nationalists and Nazi Germany" and that "the move appears to question whether Jews are really American". Some decried the order as a political stunt, and called on Trump to more directly address the threat of white nationalism. Groups such as the Anti-Defamation League, the Republican Jewish Coalition, and the Orthodox Union were supportive of the order.

Trump and Anti-Semitism 
Throughout his presidency, Donald Trump was accused of anti-Semitism numerous times. In a speech at the Israeli-American Council in 2019 Trump referenced classic anti-Semitic tropes in his appeal to Jewish voters. Discourse around Trump’s relationship with Judaism in America was recently revived. In October 2022 Trump called for American Jews to, “appreciate Israel before it’s too late,” aligning with his past claims that American Jews no longer love Israel.

See also
Antisemitism in the United States
History of antisemitism in the United States
Jewish Nationalism

References

External links
Whitehouse.gov

2019 in American law
2019 in Judaism
Executive orders of Donald Trump
Opposition to antisemitism in the United States
Trump administration controversies